The 1956 FDGB-Pokal started with 148 teams. It was the sixth time that the East German national cup in association football was contested. Due to the switch to a calendar year season the final took place at the end of the year.

Two qualifying rounds were played before the first round. All rounds were played as knock-out matches with extra time following a draw after 90 minutes. If extra time yielded no winner, the teams faced each other again in a replay.

120 quarter-finalist of the DDR-Bezirkspokal competitions were joined by 21 members of the third-tier 2nd DDR-Liga that had been created in 1955. After the second qualifying round, the remaining 36 teams were joined by the 28 teams from the top-tier DDR-Oberliga and the second-tier DDR-Liga.
By the third round proper none of the Bezirkspokal or 2nd DDR-Liga sides remained. In addition Oberliga sides Rotation Babelsberg, Motor Karl-Marx-Stadt, SC Rotation Leipzig and Motor Zwickau had been eliminated. Three DDR-Liga teams entered the quarter-finals – Chemie Wolfen, Chemie Halle-Leuna and BSG Chemie Zeitz – but only Halle went through to the semi-finals after a 4–3 extra time win over Aktivist Brieske-Senftenberg. In the semi-final the underdogs from Halle held Oberliga side Turbine Erfurt to a 1-all draw after extra time – and won the replay 5-0 to reach the final in Magdeburg. Their opponents were ZASK Vorwärts Berlin who had eliminated holders and Oberliga champions Wismut Karl-Marx-Stadt.

First qualifying round 

 Wacker walkover; Stahl withdrew
 Chemie walkover; Einheit withdrew

BSG Wismut Auerbach, BSG Wismut Schneeberg, BSG Stahl Lippendorf were given byes to the second qualifying round.

Replay

Second qualifying round

Replay

First round 

 Berlin walkover; Halle withdrew

Replays 

 Result unknown, Schneeberg advanced

Second round 
(played on 18 November 1956)

Replay

Third round 
(played on 25 November 1956)

Quarter-finals 
(played on 2 December 1956)

Semi-finals 
(played on 9 December 1956)

Replay 
(played on 12 December 1956)

Final

References 

1956
East
1956 in East German football